Philip Tribley (born 15 July 1929) was a Bermudian swimmer. He competed in two events at the 1948 Summer Olympics.

References

External links
 

1929 births
Year of death missing
Bermudian male swimmers
Olympic swimmers of Bermuda
Swimmers at the 1948 Summer Olympics
Place of birth missing